Home Farm may refer to:

Farms
 Home farm (agriculture), a part of a large country estate that is farmed by the landowner or an employed farm manager
 Home Farm, Brodick, the estate farm for Brodick Castle, in Scotland
 Home Farm (East Whitehall, New York), historic farm
 Home Farm (Leesburg, Virginia), Virginia Historic Landmark and farm, and U.S. National Register of Historic Places
 Home Farm, Old Dalby, Grade II listed building in Leicestershire
 Duchy Home Farm, an organic farm within the grounds of Highgrove House, England
 Home Farm, fictional farm and business in the UK soap opera Emmerdale
 Home Farm, fictional farm in the UK radio soap opera The Archers

Football
 Home Farm Everton, name of Home Farm F.C. between 1995 and 1999
 Home Farm F.C., Irish football club
 Home Farm Fingal, name of Dublin City F.C. before 2001
 Home Farm, former home ground of Queens Park Rangers F.C.

Other uses
 Home Farm, Bracknell, a suburb in Berkshire, England
 Home Farm (Woodland Trust), a Woodland Trust area between Burkham and Bentworth, Hampshire
 Home Farm, a development near Caerleon, southern Wales

See also
Manor Farm (disambiguation), a similar sort of farm established during the centuries of manorialism